Chahardeh or Chahar Deh may refer to:
 Chahardeh, former name of Dibaj, a city in Semnan Province
 Chahar Deh, Chaharmahal and Bakhtiari
 Chahar Deh, Fars
 Chahar Deh, Gilan
 Chahar Deh, Golestan
 Chahar Deh, Khuzestan
 Chahar Deh-e Rudbar, Mazandaran Province
 Chahar Deh, Razavi Khorasan
 Chahar Deh, Mashhad, Razavi Khorasan Province
 Chahar Deh, Qaen, South Khorasan Province
 Chahar Deh, Tabas, South Khorasan Province
 Chahardeh-ye Bala, South Khorasan Province
 Chahardeh-ye Pain, South Khorasan Province
 Chahardeh Rural District, in Gilan Province